Group C of the 2021 Rugby League World Cup is one of the four groups in the 2021 Rugby League World Cup, which will be played in 2022. The group comprises automatic qualifiers New Zealand and Lebanon as well as 2018 Americas Champions Jamaica and Ireland who qualified through the 2019 European play-off tournament.

The pool draw was made on 16 January 2020. The fixtures were announced on 21 July 2020. A revised schedule was issued on 19 November 2021 following the postponement of the tournament from 2021 to 2022.

Standings

Matches

Jamaica vs Ireland

New Zealand vs Lebanon

New Zealand vs Jamaica

Lebanon vs Ireland

New Zealand vs Ireland

Lebanon vs Jamaica

References

External links 
 https://www.rlwc2021.com/

2021 Rugby League World Cup